aka Torasan's Song of the Seagull is a 1980 Japanese comedy film directed by Yoji Yamada. It stars Kiyoshi Atsumi as Torajirō Kuruma (Tora-san), and Ran Itō as his love interest or "Madonna". Foster Daddy, Tora! is the twenty-sixth entry in the popular, long-running Otoko wa Tsurai yo series.

Synopsis
Tor-san takes care of the teenage daughter of a friend after he dies. He takes the girl to Tokyo where she wishes to study, and becomes worried over her romantic life.

Cast
 Kiyoshi Atsumi as Torajirō
 Chieko Baisho as Sakura
 Ran Itō as Sumire
 Shimojo Masami as Kuruma Tatsuzō
 Chieko Misaki as Tsune Kuruma (Torajiro's aunt)
 Gin Maeda as Hiroshi Suwa
 Hayato Nakamura as Mitsuo Suwa
 Hisao Dazai as Boss (Umetarō Katsura)
 Gajirō Satō as Genkō
 Chishū Ryū as Gozen-sama
 Takehiro Murata as Sadao Kikuchi
 Tatsuo Matsumura as Professor Hayashi

Critical appraisal
Kiyoshi Atsumi was nominated for the Best Actor prize at the Japan Academy Prize ceremony for his roles in Foster Daddy, Tora! and the following entry in the series, Tora-san's Love in Osaka (1981). Stuart Galbraith IV writes that Foster Daddy, Tora! is one of the top films in the Otoko wa Tsurai yo series, and "like the best entries, both funny and sweet". The German-language site molodezhnaja gives Foster Daddy, Tora! three and a half out of five stars.

Availability
Foster Daddy, Tora! was released theatrically on December 27, 1980. In Japan, the film was released on videotape in 1996, and in DVD format in 1999, 2002, and 2008.

References

Bibliography

English

German

Japanese

External links
 Foster Daddy, Tora! at www.tora-san.jp (official site)
 

1980 films
Films directed by Yoji Yamada
1980 comedy films
1980s Japanese-language films
Otoko wa Tsurai yo films
Shochiku films
Films with screenplays by Yôji Yamada
1980s Japanese films